Suleymanovo (Höläymän) is a rural locality (a village) in Lemez-Tamaksky Selsoviet, Mechetlinsky District, Bashkortostan, Russia. The population was 472 as of 2010. There are 7 streets.

Geography 
Suleymanovo is located 27 km south of Bolsheustyikinskoye (the district's administrative centre) by road. Kutushevo is the nearest rural locality.

References 

Rural localities in Mechetlinsky District